The Sardar Patel National Unity Award is an award by Ministry of Home Affairs, Government of India. The award is to recognise Indian citizens who have contributed towards promoting the national unity and integrity of India. This award is scheduled to be announced on 31 October 2021, National Unity Day in India - which is also Sardar Patel's birthday

Background
Sardar Patel played an important role in uniting the provinces at the time of India's independence. Patel is remembered for the integrity and unity of the country. In 2019 modi government announced this award to recognise the extraordinary contributions towards the unity and integrity of the country.

Award Committee
The recipients of the award will be selected by the award committee which includes:

 the Prime Minister
 Cabinet Secretary
 Secretary to the President
 Home Secretary

also, three or four members will be selected by Prime Minister for the award committee.

External links
 Official Website

References

Civil awards and decorations of India